KVPX-LD, virtual and UHF digital channel 28, is a low-powered Sonlife-affiliated television station licensed to Las Vegas, Nevada, United States. The station is owned by HC2 Holdings. The station's transmitter is located in Henderson.

In June 2013, KVPX-LD was slated to be sold to Landover 5 as part of a larger deal involving 51 other low-power television stations; the sale fell through in June 2016.

During the 2015 Consumer Electronic Show in Las Vegas, it was reported that KVPX was used for demonstrating the new ATSC 3.0 technique in 4K-UHD.

Mako Communications sold its stations, including KVPX-LD, to HC2 Holdings in 2017.

References

External links

VPX
Television channels and stations established in 1992
Low-power television stations in the United States